Candid Camera is a popular and long-running American hidden camera reality television series. Versions of the show appeared on television from 1948 until 2014. Originally created and produced by Allen Funt, it often featured practical jokes, and initially began on radio as The Candid Microphone on June 28, 1947.

After a series of theatrical film shorts, also titled Candid Microphone, Funt's concept came to television on August 10, 1948, and continued into the 1970s. Aside from occasional specials in the 1980s, the show was off air until 1991, when Funt reluctantly authorized a syndicated revival with Dom DeLuise as host and Vin Di Bona producing; it ran for one year. The show made a comeback on CBS in 1996 before moving to PAX TV in 2001. This incarnation of the weekly series ended on May 5, 2004, concurrent with the selling of the PAX network itself. Beginning on August 11, 2014, the show returned in a new series with hour-long episodes on TV Land, but this incarnation only lasted a single season.

The format has been revived numerous times, appearing on U.S. TV networks and in syndication (first-run) in each succeeding decade, as either a regular show or a series of specials. Funt, who died in 1999, hosted or co-hosted all versions of the show until he became too ill to continue. His son Peter Funt, who had co-hosted the specials with his father since 1987, became the producer and host. A United Kingdom version of the format aired from 1960 to 1976.

Premise

The show involved concealed cameras filming ordinary people being confronted with unusual situations, sometimes involving trick props, such as a desk with drawers that pop open when one is closed or a car with a hidden extra gas tank. When the joke was revealed, victims were told the show's catchphrase, "Smile, you're on Candid Camera." The catchphrase became a song with music and lyrics by Sid Ramin.

The show often played its hidden-camera pranks on celebrities as well: one episode had actress Ann Jillian  scheduled to make a small donation to a Lithuanian charity. When police officers informed her a con artist was behind the charity, they persuaded her to donate a much larger amount with the assurance that he would be arrested when he accepted the check. After the arrest attempt, Jillian was told the man was running a legitimate charity, a set-up that forced her into acting as though she had intended to donate hundreds of thousands of dollars all along.

In another episode, the show filmed the reactions of citizens after they saw the former President Harry S. Truman walking down the street. After being advised that the former president and his Secret Service entourage would be taking a walk in downtown Manhattan, the program tracked them with a hidden camera in a van.  A young woman who was a champion runner was planted at a street corner they would pass, and she was asking directions from a passerby when she saw Truman and shouted hello. In a stunt suggestive of the classic radio play The Hitchhiker, she then ran around the block so she could be ahead of Truman and was at the next corner where she again said hello to him as he approached.  After this was done several times, she asked President Truman if something seemed familiar.  The former president replied he expected she had something to do with the van that had been following him, and pointed straight into the camera with his walking stick without turning to look.

Some of Funt's pieces did not involve pranks but consisted simply of interviews with ordinary people. There were bizarre sequences in which people, sometimes children, gave one-of-a-kind interpretations of works of art.  A little girl once told Funt that The Discus Thrower by Praxiteles showed a man throwing his little girl's allowance to her while she stood in the back yard.

Radio history
The Candid Microphone was first heard on Saturday, June 28, 1947, at 7:30 p.m. on ABC radio. That series came to an end on September 23, 1948. The announcer for the radio program was Dorian St. George (1911–2004).

Beginning June 6, 1950, The Candid Microphone was broadcast by CBS on Tuesdays at 9:30 p.m., sponsored by Philip Morris, which continued for three months until August 29.

TV history

Funt brought his program to ABC television in 1948, using the Candid Microphone title of the radio series, and then switched to NBC in the fall of 1949 (for Philip Morris, with Ken Roberts as his announcer), at which point its name was changed to Candid Camera. The format moved to syndication in 1951 and continued for three years before returning to NBC in 1958 as a segment of Jack Paar's The Tonight Show. The segment reappeared in 1959 on CBS as a feature on The Garry Moore Show, before once again becoming a standalone show in 1960.

Its longest uninterrupted run came in the CBS Sunday evening version. Debuting in October 1960, dominating its 10pm time slot for seven years, the program reached its peak in 1963 placing second for the year in the national Nielsen ratings. In these shows producer/host Funt was joined on stage by several co-hosts. Veteran CBS broadcaster Arthur Godfrey joined Funt for the first season, until he quit due to an inability to get along with the volatile Funt.  Replacing him was Garry Moore's long time announcer and sidekick Durward Kirby from 1961 to 1966. For the final prime time season, TV hostess and former Miss America, Bess Myerson co-hosted. The 1966-67 season, with Myerson, saw the series' first use of color film. Appearances on the show by silent film comedy legend Buster Keaton were included in the 1987 Thames Television tribute documentary Buster Keaton: A Hard Act To Follow. Among the standout favorite segments was 1965's traffic cop Vic Cianca with the Pittsburgh Police, who gained national exposure through the show and later appeared in Budweiser commercials, as well as Italian TV and the movie Flashdance. A then-unknown Woody Allen was one of the writers for the show in the early 1960s and performed in some scenarios. Though a rarity, a few celebrities appeared in the last CBS season; among them were baseball legend Jackie Robinson, impressionists George Kirby and Rich Little, singer Mike Douglas and rock vocal group The Four Seasons.

Following an ABC special in the summer of 1974 celebrating the program's 25th anniversary, Candid Camera returned that fall for a five-year run in weekly syndication, with Funt as emcee again and John Bartholomew Tucker and Dorothy Collins as early co-hosts. Fannie Flagg, one of Funt's writers during the 1960s run, also shared emcee duties with Funt during the 1970s era, as did Phyllis George, Betsy Palmer and Jo Ann Pflug. This version was taped at the Ed Sullivan Theater in New York City for its first season, then moved to WTVF in Nashville for the remainder of its run.

The network TV version celebrated its 35th anniversary with an NBC special in 1983. Four years later, a series of occasional Candid Camera specials aired on CBS with Peter Funt joining his father as co-host.

The show also aired a season in daily syndication (1991–92) with Dom DeLuise as host and Eva LaRue as co-host. Produced by Vin Di Bona, Funt authorized this version, but did not approve of the format or host. He stated in his biography Candidly (1994) that he deeply regretted his decision (which he made strictly for financial reasons) mainly because he did not think DeLuise understood the spirit of the show or was an appropriate host, and also because he felt the bits were weak, uninteresting, and too preoccupied with incorporating the show's sponsor, Pizza Hut, into them in an overtly commercial way.

A 1996 CBS program celebrating the 50th anniversary of the format (dating back to the Candid Microphone days) led to another series of occasional Candid Camera specials, and then to its return as a weekly CBS show with Peter Funt and Suzanne Somers as co-hosts. The show moved to the PAX TV network in 2001 with Dina Eastwood taking over as co-host, remaining on the air for three more years before suspending production.

In April 2014, it was announced that the TV Land cable channel was reviving the show, ordering ten episodes. Peter Funt returned as a host, joined by actress Mayim Bialik as co-host, with the series premiering on August 11. However, it was not renewed for a second season.

Ratings

The 1960–67 run was arguably the most successful version of the show, according to the Nielsen ratings:
 1960–61: #7 (27.3 rating)
 1961–62: #10 (25.5 rating)
 1962–63: #2 (31.1 rating)
 1963–64: #7 (27.7 rating)

Films
In 1970, Funt wrote, narrated, directed and produced an X-rated Candid Camera-style theatrical reality film, What Do You Say to a Naked Lady? A second film, Money Talks, followed in 1972.

What Do You Say to a Naked Lady? eventually led to a series of videotapes of an adult-oriented (containing nudity) version of Candid Camera, produced in the 1980s, called Candid Candid Camera. These videos were shown on HBO and the Playboy Channel.

Reruns
The 1960s version was seen in reruns on CBS daytime at 10am EST from September 26, 1966 to September 6, 1968, with local stations continuing to air the series for the next several years. It also aired on the Ha! comedy network in 1990-91.

The 1970s version continued to play on local stations for several years after its cancellation, followed by a run on cable's USA Network later in the 1980s, and another go-round on both Comedy Central and E! in the early 1990s.

Reruns of the late 1990s version and the Pax version were carried by GMC TV for a time in 2011. The final season of the 60s version and first season of the 70s version aired on JLTV from 2012 to 2013, and returned to the weekday schedule in December 2016.

No episodes from the 1991-92 season were rerun.

Legacy

Television
A British version of Candid Camera began in 1960 and ran for seven years. It was initially presented by David Nixon or Bob Monkhouse and featured Jonathan Routh and Arthur Atkins as pranksters. The show briefly returned in 1974, hosted by Peter Dulay, with Arthur Atkins and Sheila Bernette. Another series was aired in 1976 with Jonathan Routh in charge, with Dulay as producer. These two 1970s series reappeared in 1986, with an opening sequence from Peter Dulay. Jeremy Beadle made his name hosting prank shows, notably Beadle's About in the 1980s and 1990s. Channel 4 and Dom Joly developed Trigger Happy TV in the early part of the 21st century. A similar style show with no real presenter went out as Just for Laughs on the BBC around the same time.

An Australian version of Candid Camera, titled Candid Camera On Australia, aired on the Ten Network in 1989-90.

A French version of Candid Camera, titled La Caméra invisible on RTF.

Quebec saw its own adaptation titled Les insolences d'une caméra.

A German variant of Candid Camera, known as Verstehen Sie Spaß?, was begun in 1980 and continues to air as of 2019.

A wave of other American hidden-camera prank shows began in the 1980s: Totally Hidden Video was shown on Fox from 1989 until 1992. MTV's Ashton Kutcher vehicle, Punk'd, devised elaborate pranks on celebrities. Some shows have been criticized because of the potential cruelty inherent in the pranks, such as Scare Tactics. Oblivious was a series which gave cash prizes to unsuspecting subjects in the street who answered trivia questions but did not realize they were on a game show. More recent prank shows have been Girls Behaving Badly, Just for Laughs: Gags, The Jamie Kennedy Experiment, Boiling Points, Trigger Happy TV, and Howie Do It. Perhaps the most ambitious of all was The Joe Schmo Show in which Matt Kennedy Gould was surrounded by actors and hoaxed for the entire series.

One episode of Supermarket Sweep from 1991 featured Johnny Gilbert mentioning during the Big Sweep to a team member named Barry (who also appeared on Monopoly): "He thinks he's on Candid Camera, but he knows he's on Supermarket Sweep!"

In a 2010 interview, Peter Funt commented on some of these shows, saying,
We’ve always come at it from the idea that we believe people are wonderful and we’re out to confirm it. Our imitators and other shows, whether it’s Jamie Kennedy or Punk’d, often seem to come at it from the opposite perspective, which is that people are stupid, and we’re going to find ways to underscore that.

Academia
In 1964, Cornell University's Department of Psychology asked for and received permission to maintain an archive of Candid Camera and Candid Microphone episodes for educational research and study purposes.

Home media

VHS
 Candid Camera Christmas
 Candid Camera Golf Gags
 Candid Camera's All-Time Funniest Moments Parts I & II
 Candid Camera's Biggest Surprises
 Candid Camera's Pets & Animals
 Candid Candid Camera (adult content)
 Candid Kids

DVD
 Best of the 1960s Volume One
 Best of the 1960s Volume Two
 Best of the 1970s Volume One
 Best of the 1970s Volume Two
 Best of the 1980s Volume One
 Best of the 1990s Volume One
 Best of Today Volume One
 Best of Today Volume Two
 Candid Camera: Greatest Moments
 Candid Camera: Fooling The Senses
 Green Kid
 Inspirational Smiles
 Most Requested Characters
 The Funt Family Collection

Classic audio CD
 Candid Microphone (1960)

References

Further reading
 Funt, Allen. Eavesdropper at Large: Adventures in Human Nature with "Candid Mike". Vanguard Press, 1952.
 Funt, Allen. Candid Kids. Bernard Geis, 1964.

External links
 Candid Camera official site
 
 Candid Microphone with Allen Funt and Bela Lugosi
 Candid Microphone (July 14, 1947)
 
 
 
 
 
 
 
 
 
 
 Belgian candidcamera (2010) candidcamera.be

1947 radio programme debuts
1948 radio programme endings
1950 radio programme debuts
1950 radio programme endings
ABC radio programs
CBS Radio programs
American radio sketch shows
1948 American television series debuts
1951 American television series endings
1959 American television series debuts
1967 American television series endings
1974 American television series debuts
1979 American television series endings
1983 American television series debuts
1983 American television series endings
1987 American television series debuts
1988 American television series endings
1991 American television series debuts
1992 American television series endings
1996 American television series debuts
2001 American television series endings
2014 American television series debuts
1940s American comedy television series
1950s American comedy television series
1960s American comedy television series
1970s American comedy television series
1980s American comedy television series
1990s American comedy television series
2000s American comedy television series
2010s American comedy television series
2010s American reality television series
CBS original programming
PAX TV original programming
TV Land original programming
American hidden camera television series
Black-and-white American television shows
Television series based on radio series
English-language television shows
American television series revived after cancellation
Hidden camera television series